Peggy Stewart (born Peggy O'Rourke; June 5, 1923 – May 29, 2019) was an American actress known for her roles in Western B movies and television series.

Early life 
Stewart was born in West Palm Beach, Florida, where she was raised, the daughter of John Francis O'Rourke and Frances Velma (McCampbell) Splane, who were from Bessemer, Alabama. She distinguished herself as a swimming champion in high school; in the 1930s, her family moved to California, where she met character actor Henry O'Neill. He recommended her to Paramount Pictures executives who were looking for a new actress for the part of Joel McCrea's teenage daughter in Wells Fargo (1937). Her work in the film led to numerous other film roles.

Career 
In April 1944, Stewart signed a contract with Republic Pictures and began starring in Western B movies opposite such actors as Allan Lane, Sunset Carson, and Wild Bill Elliott. During that time she played in several episodes of Adventures of Red Ryder. She usually played the part of the tough heroine, rather than a passive girl needing to be saved. From 1944 to 1951 she starred in 35 films, most of which were Westerns and film serials. She also starred with Gene Autry several times during that period. as well as appearing on several episodes of The Cisco Kid, including "Oil Land", which first aired on October 10, 1950.

In 1949, she played alongside Jim Bannon in Ride, Ryder, Ride. She again played the part of heroine to Bannon in 1949, starring in The Fighting Redhead. In 1952 she starred with Bill Elliott in Kansas Territory. In 1957, she had a minor role on CBS's Have Gun – Will Travel episode "The Outlaw". In 1958, she was cast as Etta Jackson, the romantic interest of the painter Hurley Abbott, played by Brad Johnson, in the episode "The Underdog" of the ABC/Desilu western series, The Life and Legend of Wyatt Earp, with Hugh O'Brian in the title role.

Later years 
Her career slowed in the 1960s, and by the 1970s she was residing in Studio City, California. Stewart won the Golden Boot Awards in 1984. Semi-retired, Stewart still continued to act on occasion. She played a minor part in a 1993 episode of Seinfeld titled "The Implant", in which she portrayed the aunt of George Costanza's girlfriend.

Stewart played Pam Beesly's grandmother, Mee-Maw, in a 2009 episode of The Office and reprised the role in a 2010 episode. In 2012, she played Grandma Delores in Adam Sandler's comedy film, That's My Boy.

Personal life 
In her latter decades, Stewart appeared regularly as a guest speaker at Western film festivals. From 1993 till her death, Stewart appeared as a special guest at the annual Lone Pine Film Festival.

Stewart was married twice. In 1940 she married actor Don "Red" Barry; the marriage ended in divorce in 1944. She was married to actor Buck Young from 1953 until his death on February 9, 2000.

Her sister, Patricia Ann O'Rourke, was married to the actor Wayne Morris.

She died in May 2019 at the age of 95.

Filmography

Film

Partial Television Credits

References

External links 

 
 
 B-western ladies, Peggy Stewart

1923 births
2019 deaths
20th-century American actresses
21st-century American actresses
Actresses from Florida
American film actresses
American television actresses
People from Studio City, Los Angeles
People from West Palm Beach, Florida
Western (genre) film actresses